Methylenediurea deaminase (methylenediurease) is an enzyme with systematic name methylenediurea aminohydrolase found in Brucella anthropi, a bacterium. This enzyme catalyses the following chemical reaction:

 methylenediurea + 2 H2O  N-(hydroxymethyl)urea + 2 NH3 + CO2 (overall reaction)
 (1a) methylenediurea + H2O  N-(carboxyaminomethyl)urea + NH3
 (1b) N-(carboxyaminomethyl)urea  N-(aminomethyl)urea + CO2 (spontaneous)
 (1c) N-(aminomethyl)urea + H2O  N-(hydroxymethyl)urea + NH3 (spontaneous)

Methylenediurea is hydrolysed and decarboxylated to give an aminated methylurea.

References

External links 
 

EC 3.5.3